Anthony Terrell Toribio (born March 1, 1985) is a former American football defensive tackle. He was signed by the Miami Dolphins as an undrafted free agent in 2008 and also spent time on the practice squad for the Green Bay Packers. Toribio then played for the Kansas City Chiefs from 2010 to 2013. He played college football at Carson-Newman.

External links
Carson-Newman Eagles bio
Kansas City Chiefs bio

1985 births
Living people
Miami Central Senior High School alumni
Players of American football from Miami
American football defensive tackles
Carson–Newman Eagles football players
Miami Dolphins players
Green Bay Packers players
Kansas City Chiefs players